Leo Menalo (born January 6, 2002) is a Croatian professional basketball player for Virtus Bologna of the Italian Lega Basket Serie A (LBA) and the EuroLeague. Due to his Italian upbringing, he is considered a "homegrown player" in the domestic championship.

Professional career

Stella Azzurra Roma (2018–2022)
After having played in the youth teams of KK Cibona, Menalo moved to A.S. Stella Azzurra of Rome in 2018, where he initially played in the youth teams. With Stella Azzurra, Menalo played in Serie A2, the second-tier league of Italian basketball.

Virtus Bologna (2022–present)
On 2 August 2022, Menalo signed a four-years deal with Virtus Bologna, of the Italian Lega Basket Serie A (LBA) and the EuroLeague, one of the most important teams in Europe. On 29 September 2022, after having ousted Olimpia Milano in the semifinals, Virtus won its third Supercup, defeating 72–69 Banco di Sardegna Sassari and achieving a back-to-back, following the 2021 trophy.

References

2002 births
Living people
Italian men's basketball players
Lega Basket Serie A players
Croatian men's basketball players
Power forwards (basketball)
Virtus Bologna players